Mass media in Morocco includes newspapers, radio, television, and Internet.

The first newspaper to be founded in Morocco was the Spanish-language El Eco de Tetuán in 1860. Such publications were not generally available in Moroccan cities until 1908. "Al Maghrib" was the first Arabic newspaper in the country and it was established in 1886
.

The government of Morocco owns many key media outlets, including several major Moroccan radio and television channels, and the Moroccan press agency, Maghreb Arab Press. Moroccans have access to approximately 2,000 domestic and foreign publications. Many of the major dailies and weeklies can now be accessed on their own Web sites. Morocco has 27 AM radio stations, 25 FM radio stations, 6 shortwave stations, and 11 television stations including the channels of the public SNRT, the mixed-ownership (half public-half private) 2M TV started out in 1989 as the first private terrestrial channel in Morocco, however it later became a mixed ownership channel as 70% of its capital was bought by the government. and the privately owned Medi1 TV.

History

Early history
The first newspaper to appear in Morocco was an English weekly called "Maghreb Al Aksa" in 1877. Such publications were not generally available in Moroccan cities until 1908. There was one newspaper before: "El Eco de Tetuán 1860" in Spanish. It was founded by Pedro Antonio de Alarcón, Spanish writer and journalist.

In 1883, Abraham Lévy-Cohen, a Jew from Tangier, established , a French-language newspaper for the dissemination of the French language, culture, and political ideas among the Jews of Morocco.

In 1906, Sheikh Muhammad Bin Abdul-Kabir Al-Kattani started publishing a short-lived Arabic-language newspaper called al-Taʿun, meaning "the plague." He used this newspaper to speak out in opposition to increasing Western influence ostensibly the "plague" for which the newspaper was named in Moroccan politics, economy, and society.

Under the French protectorate from 1920, French titles such as "L’Echo du Maroc" and "la Vigie Marocaine" started to appear. They were followed by the launch of a press group called "Mas" which issued "Farmhouse" and the daily newspapers "Le petit marocain" and "L'Écho du Maroc", although these titles continued to cater mainly to foreigners.

More recently, Moroccan nationalists such as Mohamed Al Ouazzani began to publish their own titles. In 1933 he founded "L'action du peuple", a weekly French language newspaper. Later, Abdekhalek Torres and Mohamed Bennouna issued two publications in Arabic in Tetouan "Al Salam" and "Al Hayat" respectively. These gave the nationalists a platform to advance their demands regarding independence from both France and Spain. More and more foreign press published in Morocco appeared. Morocco issued a press code on 15 November 1958.

Today
The government of Morocco owns many key media outlets, including Moroccan radio and television. Moroccans have access to approximately 2,000 domestic and foreign publications. The Moroccan press agency, Maghreb Arab Press, and one Arabic daily newspaper, Al-Anbaa, are official organs of the government. One additional Arabic daily newspaper, Assahra Al Maghribia, and one French-language daily newspaper, Le Matin, are semi-official organs of the government.

Economic framework

In the past the majority of Moroccan newspapers did not represent actual commercial ventures or profit-making corporations, since they were essentially the written public outlet of political parties. As such they were owned by political interests and survived on contributions and government subsidies. In the last 10 years an influx of new capital has led to the creation of newspapers and periodicals that aspire to become commercially profitable. The new publications are still heavily dependent on the government's budgetary allocations and that this reliance is inversely proportional to the professional autonomy of the younger generation of journalists.

Electronic news media

The development of the Internet has brought a new dimension to news reporting in Morocco: many of the major dailies and weeklies can now be accessed on their own Web sites. The landscape is changing almost as quickly as the Moroccan skyline. New publications such as "Morocco Newsline" (www.morocconewsline.com), an online English language newspaper, are in line with the country's efforts to attract English speaking tourists and investors. Subsequently, in 2007, tourist arrivals from all countries of origin increased. The most significant increase came from the UK, whose 344,000 visitors represented a 41% rise from 2005 figures.

Press freedom

Although journalists continue to practice self-censorship, opposition dailies have begun to explore social and political issues that have traditionally been considered out of bounds. However, the media continue to exercise great caution when discussing government corruption, human rights and Morocco's policy toward Western Sahara. Radio Méditerranée Internationale (Medi-1), a joint French/Moroccan broadcaster, also practices self-censorship.

According to the most recent available information, Morocco has 27 AM radio stations, 25 FM radio stations, 6 shortwave stations, and 11 television stations including all the channels of the public SNRT, the mixed-owned 2M TV and the private Medi1 TV.

On December 20, 2006, Moroccan Prime Minister Driss Jettou banned the Arabophone weekly magazine Nichane. This action was taken in retaliation for publishing "provocative jokes" related to religion. The website was also shut down.

In 2009, Reporters Without Borders said in an evaluation of the state of press freedom in Morocco that real progress at the start of King Mohammed's reign had been followed by reverses and tension, especially from 2002 onward. The number of daily and weekly newspapers has grown dramatically since 1999 and several new radio and TV stations were given licenses when state control of broadcasting began to be relaxed in May 2006, offering Moroccans some diversity in this sector for the first time. Despite the impartiality of the High Council for Broadcasting (CSCA), there was widespread disappointment that no new TV stations and only four new radio stations (either regional or specialist ones) were awarded licences in a second wave in February of this year. There had been 23 applicants. Although Morocco now tolerates more media criticism and more editorial freedom, the Palace still does not accept that the media have an important role to play. It allows some leeway to print media journalists because only 1 per cent of the population buys newspapers and magazines, with only a few newspapers such as Tel Quel and Le Journal Hebdomadaire being more independent.
The media still has to face obstacles, archaic laws and arbitrary reactions. Policemen often assault reporters and photographers and confiscate their equipment. Twenty policemen raided the Arabic-language weekly Al Ayam on 10 February just because of a photo of a member of the royal family which it had requested permission to publish. Combined total of nearly 25 years in prison for journalists since 1999.
Journalists can still be jailed under the Moroccan press code. The media were angered by the code's latest revision, in May 2002, because the possibility of prison sentences was maintained even if the maximum terms were cut significantly (for example, from 20 to five years for attacks on the king's honor).
The most draconian article, 41, extended the defamation law's applicability to Islam and Morocco's territorial integrity, while the courts, in addition to the executive, were given the power to suspend or close newspapers. The latter provision would arguably have been a move in the right direction if it had not been for the fact that Morocco's courts are not independent.

Ranking
With a score of 43.98, in 2019, Morocco ranked 135th out of the 180 countries assessed in the 2019 Worldwide press freedom index from Reporters Without Borders. Scores range from 6 to 85, with smaller scores corresponding to greater freedom of press.

{| class= "wikitable sortable" style="border: 1px solid #CCC; padding: 2px; margin: 1px;"
|- style="background-color: #99F;"
! Year !! Rank !! Score
|-
| 2002 || 089 || 29.00
|-
| 2003 || 131 || 39.67
|-
| 2004 || 126 || 43.00
|-
| 2005 || 119 || 36.17
|-
| 2006 || 097 || 24.83
|-
| 2007 || 106 || 33.25
|-
| 2008 || 122 || 32.25
|-
| 2009 || 127 || 41.00
|-
| 2010 || 135 || 47.40
|-
| 2011-12 || 138 || 63.29
|-
| 2013 || 136 || 39.04
|-
| 2014 || 136 || 39.72
|-
| 2015 || 130 || 39.19
|-
| 2016 || 131 || 42.64
|-
| 2017 || 133 || 42.42
|-
| 2018 || 135 || 43.13
|-
| 2019 || 135 || 43.98
|}

Media companies

Telecommunications

 Inwi
 Maroc Telecom
 Meditel
 Mobisud
 Wana (Telecommunications)

Television
The public broadcaster SNRT currently runs nine television channels:

Al Aoula (SNRT 1)
Al Aoula Europe
Al Aoula Middle East
Laayoune TV
Arryadia (SNRT 3)
Arryadia 2
Arrabia (SNRT 4)
Al Maghribia (SNRT 5)
Assadissa (SNRT 6)
Aflam TV (SNRT 7)
Tamazight TV (SNRT 8)

State-owned channels:

 2M TV
 Medi 1 TV

All of the above channels can be viewed nationwide, on analog terrestrial networks. Moroccans who have digital terrestrial television, are eligible to view many Arabic and French private channels, including Nickelodeon, MTV, MBC or M6, which are freely accessible.

Radio

 Casa FM
 Chada FM
 Hit Radio
 Medi 1
 Medina FM Radio
 MFM Radio
 Radio Aswat
 Radio Atlantic
 Radio Plus (Morocco)
 SNRT Arabic
 SNRT Chaine inter
 SNRT coranique
 Radio 2M

See also

 List of magazines in Morocco
 List of newspapers in Morocco
 Internet censorship in Morocco
 Telephone numbers in Morocco
 Television in Morocco
 Cinema of Morocco

References

Bibliography

External links
 Moroccan News outlet in English
 Moroccan American News portal in English
 Reporters Without Borders
 Morocco and World News portal in English
 (News aggregator; description of site:)

 
Morocco
Morocco